Padera Lake is a fresh water reservoir located near Midlothian, Texas. The lake is situated along Highway 287.

2015 flood
During heavy rainstorms in 2015, the reservoir came close to breaching its banks. Engineers constructed a Relief Dam which successfully prevented any damage.

References

Reservoirs in Texas
Protected areas of Ellis County, Texas
Bodies of water of Ellis County, Texas